George David Eric Hirst (born 15 February 1999) is an English professional footballer who plays as a forward for Ipswich Town, on loan from Leicester City. He is the son of former footballer David Hirst.

Club career

Sheffield Wednesday
After coming through the academy, Hirst signed his first professional contract for Sheffield Wednesday in March 2016.

He made his first team debut against Cambridge United on 9 August 2016, in the EFL Cup in a 2–1 defeat. His league debut came on 10 December 2016 against Reading in a 2–1 defeat. In April 2018, Hirst was linked with a move to Manchester United after rejecting a long-term contract at Sheffield Wednesday.

OH Leuven
In June 2018, Hirst was signed by a second division Belgian team, Oud-Heverlee Leuven, led by former Sheffield Wednesday player Nigel Pearson.

Leicester City
After just one season at OH Leuven, Hirst joined Leicester City in the summer of 2019. On 19 July 2020 Hirst made his debut for Leicester, coming on in the 83rd minute in a 3–0 loss to Tottenham Hotspur.

Rotherham United (loan)
On 16 September 2020, Hirst joined Rotherham United on a season-long loan deal.

Portsmouth (loan)
On 3 August 2021, Hirst joined League One side Portsmouth on loan for the 2021–22 season. He scored his first goal for the club on 9 November 2021 in an EFL Trophy tie against Crystal Palace U21s.

Blackburn Rovers (loan)
On 31 August 2022, Hirst joined Blackburn Rovers on a season-long loan, with an option to buy.

Ipswich Town (loan)
On 8 January 2023, Hirst joined Ipswich Town on loan for the rest of the season.

International career
Hirst made his debut for the England Under-17 national team during the Algarve Cup in February 2016 – in his second game for the team he scored twice against Germany in a 2–2 draw. He was subsequently called up to the squad for the 2016 UEFA European Under-17 Championship in Azerbaijan. In the group stage Hirst scored against Denmark and started the Quarter-final defeat against Spain.

On 23 August 2016, Hirst was called up to the England U18's for the first time. In summer 2017, Hirst represented England Under 20s at the 2017 Toulon Tournament, scoring a hat-trick in a game against Cuba to take his 2016–17 tally to 40 goals in all competitions. Hirst started in the final against the Ivory Coast which England won on penalties and was subsequently named in the team of the tournament.

On 1 September 2017, Hirst scored his second hat-trick of the Summer in a victory against Poland, for England Under-19. In July 2018, Hirst was included in the squad for the 2018 UEFA European Under-19 Championship.

In May 2019, Hirst was included in the England U20 squad for the 2019 Toulon Tournament.

Career statistics

Honours
England U20
Toulon Tournament: 2017

Individual
Toulon Tournament Team of the Tournament: 2017

References

External links
England profile at The FA

1999 births
Living people
Footballers from Sheffield
English footballers
Association football forwards
Sheffield Wednesday F.C. players
Oud-Heverlee Leuven players
Leicester City F.C. players
Rotherham United F.C. players
Portsmouth F.C. players
Blackburn Rovers F.C. players
Ipswich Town F.C. players
English Football League players
Challenger Pro League players
Premier League players
England youth international footballers
English expatriate footballers
English expatriate sportspeople in Belgium
Expatriate footballers in Belgium